Rapporteur Judge or Rapporteur-Judge is a term for number of judicial officials similar to judicial assistant at highest court (especially at constitutional court), usually functioning as rapporteur while having status equivalent to lower ordinary court judges.

South Korea

Overview 
In South Korea, Rapporteur Judge, formerly known as 'Constitutional Research Officers') or 'Constitutional Rapporteur Judges' is an official supporting nine Justices in the Constitutional Court of Korea. They exercise investigation and research for review and adjudication of cases, to prepare memoranda and draft decisions, which makes them as kind of judicial assistant for Justices in Constitutional Court of Korea. The number of Rapporteur Judges in the Court is currently around 60. Some of Rapporteur Judges are assigned to each of Justices, while others work independently under supervise of Rapporteur Judges with considerable seniority. They cannot participate or vote in deliberation between Justices.

Appointment 
South Korean Rapporteur Judges are one of position appointed by President of the Constitutional Court of Korea with consent of Council of Constitutional Court Justices, under article 16(4) of 'Constitutional Court Act'. Among the officials at the Court requiring consent of the Council for appointment are Secretary General of the Court, Deputy Secretary General and other officials as Director (above Grade 3) in Department of Court Administration. Some of newly appointed Rapporteur Judges without enough career record before appointment are called as 'Junior Rapporteur Judges' or 'Assistant Rapporteur Judges' under article 19-2 of the Act.

Status 
Unlike law clerks in United States Supreme Court serving one to two years for life tenured Justices, Rapporteur Judges in South Korea serve ten-year renewable terms up to mandatory retirement age of 60 according to article 19(7) of Constitutional Court Act, while Justices in Constitutional Court of Korea serve only six-year renewable terms under article 112(1) of Constitution. Since Justices never renewed their term as custom to defend independence of the Court, actual influence of Rapporteur Judges on decision of the Court is rather more substantial than law clerks in common law countries. As South Korean legal system has tradition of civil law, Rapporteur Judge's role is rather more like conseillers référendaires in French Cour de Cassation, where judicial assistants are originally magistrats as lower court judges themselves, yet serving as référendaires for up to ten-years to assist conseillers who are Justices in the Cour.

This dual status can be also found when lower ordinary court Judges are seconded to Constitutional Court as Rapporteur Judges under article 19(10) of the Act. For example, Yoo Nam-seok who is 7th President of the Constitutional Court of Korea served as Rapporteur Judge for several times before appointed to the President, as seconded Judge from other ordinary courts in South Korea. These Rapporteur Judges seconded from other parts of the South Korean government, such as ordinary Courts and Prosecutor's Office serve only one to two years at the Court yet expected to work as same as formally appointed Rapporteur Judges. Also, formally appointed Rapporteur Judges and ordinary lower court Judges have same level of salary table and length of term, as ordinary lower court Judges also serve ten-year renewable terms inside hierarchy of ordinary courts under article 105(2) of the Constitution. The difference between Rapporteur Judges and ordinary lower court Judges are age of retirement; Rapporteur Judges retire at age of 60, while ordinary lower court Judges retire at age of 65 under article 45(4) of Court Organization Act.

Turkey

Overview 
In Turkey, Rapporteur-Judge or simply 'Rapporteur' is an official supporting case works in the highest courts of Turkeys, including Constitutional Court of Turkey, Court of Cassation and Council of State. Some of Rapporteur-Judges are also assigned in Ministry of Justice.

Appointment 
Turkish Rapporteur Judges in the Constitutional Court are appointed directly by the President of the Court, without any necessary consent from third-party under article 24 and 25 of 'Code on Establishment and Rules of Procedures of the Constitutional Court'. Some of newly appointed Rapporteur Judges in the Court without enough career record before appointment are called as 'Assistant Rapporteurs' under article 27 of the Code. The number of Rapporteur Judges in the Court is currently around 80, while number of Assistant Rapporteurs is 20.

Status 
Unlike South Korea, Rapporteur Judges in Constitutional Court of Turkey are never assigned to each of fifteen Justices in the Court. Rather, Rapporteur Judges in Turkey are only directly responsible to the President of the Constitutional Court of Turkey, and works not under Justice but under supervise of other Rapporteur Judge with considerable seniority, called 'Chief Rapporteur Judge'. There are four divisions in the Court, and each of division is led by single Chief Rapporteur Judge. However, similar to South Korean Rapporteur Judges, Turkish Rapporteur Judges cannot participate or vote in deliberation between Justices also.

Another difference between South Korean and Turkish Rapporteur Judges in Constitutional Court is length of term and retirement age. Turkish Rapporteur Judges serves without limit of term, and the mandatory retirement age of Rapporteur Judges are same as that of ordinary lower court Judges. Since Turkish Rapporteur Judges serve without limit of term, while Justices at the Constitutional Court of Turkey serve for twelve-year terms, Turkish Rapporteur Judges have more substantial influence over the decisions of court than law clerks in common law highest courts. This influence of Turkish Rapporteur Judges are also reflected in the Constitution of Turkey. According to article 146 of the Constitution, four out of fifteen Justices in the Constitutional Court should be designated among following groups; high level executives, self-employed lawyers, first category judges and public prosecutors or rapporteurs of the Constitutional Court having served as rapporteur at least five years.

See also 
 Rapporteur
 Judge Rapporteur
 Judicial assistant
 Constitutional Court of Korea
 Constitutional Court of Turkey
 Court of Cassation (Turkey)
 Association of Asian Constitutional Courts and Equivalent Institutions

References

External links 
 AACC SRD Factfiles
 Constitutional Rapporteur Judges, Constitutional Court of Korea english website
 Rapporteur, Constitutional Court of the Republic of Turkey english website

Legal professions
Judiciary of South Korea
Turkish civil servants
French legal terminology